Tanyard Creek may refer to:

Tanyard Creek (Arkansas), a stream in Arkansas
Tanyard Creek (Echeconnee Creek tributary), a stream in Georgia

See also
Tanyard Branch (disambiguation)